Mutate is the debut studio album of Battery, released in 1993 by COP International.

Track listing

Personnel 
Adapted from the Mutate liner notes.

Battery
 Maria Azevedo – lead vocals, instruments
 Shawn Brice – instruments, engineering
 Evan Sornstein – instruments

Production and additional personnel
 Battery – production, engineering
 Curium Design – photography, design
 Christian Petke – production, engineering

Release history

References

External links 
 nv at Discogs (list of releases)

1993 debut albums
COP International albums
Battery (electro-industrial band) albums